The kanārang was a unique title in the Sasanian military, given to the commander of the Sasanian Empire's northeasternmost frontier province, Abarshahr (encompassing the cities of Nishapur, Tus and Abiward). In Byzantine sources, it is rendered as chanaranges and often used, for instance by Procopius, in lieu of the holder's actual name.

The title was used instead of the more conventional marzban, which was held by the rest of the Iranian frontier wardens. Like the other marzbans, the position was hereditary. The family holding it (the Kanarangiyan) is first attested in the reign of Yazdegerd I (r. 399–421), but was descended from some pre-Sasanian, most likely Parthian, dynasty. They enjoyed a high prestige and great authority in the Sasanian Empire's northeastern borderlands, as reflected in their glorified description in the Shahnameh of the great Persian poet Ferdowsi. They were among the great families that deposed the last powerful Sasanian monarch Khosrow II in 628.

The family was active until the very end of the Sasanian realm. A man called Kanara in Arab sources commanded the Iranian light cavalry at the decisive Battle of al-Qadisiyyah, and his son, Shahriyar bin Kanara, is reported to have fought valiantly before being killed. The family is later recorded as assisting the Muslim conquest of Khorasan by Abd-Allah ibn Amir, and being rewarded with the right to keep the province of Tus and half of the province of Nishapur under their control. They were ultimately dislodged by the Arab military officer Humayd ibn Qahtaba, probably during the latters governorship of Khorasan during the reign of the caliph al-Mansur.

Known holders of the post
 Gushnaspdad, attested 484–488
 Adergoudounbades, 488–541
 Bahram, from 541
 Kanadbak, attested 628–652, son Shahriyar bin Kanara

References

Sources 

 
 

 
Persian words and phrases
Sasanian military offices